is a Japanese adult visual novel created by Spray and published by Visual Arts for Microsoft Windows. The game was first released as a limited edition bundle on July 20, 2007, before later seeing a general release on October 12, 2007. A fan disc sequel titled Kichiku Megane R was later released for Microsoft Windows, with the limited edition released on March 27, 2009, and the standard version released on February 5, 2010.

Since the release of Kichiku Megane, several novel and manga adaptations written by the original staff of the game were released. In addition, several original audio dramas were released on CD.

Plot

Katsuya Saeki is a 25-year-old unsuccessful salaryman working in a marketing subsidiary of a pharmaceutical company whose division is at risk of being laid off. Weak-willed and shy, one evening, he comes across Mr. R, who gives him a pair of glasses that he claims to change his life. When Katsuya wears the glasses, he becomes confident and domineering, but the more he wears them, the more brutal and sadistic he becomes. The endings that the player achieves depends on which character is selected as Katsuya's love interest, whether Katsuya keeps wearing the glasses, and other choices made throughout the game.

Characters

Katsuya is a 25-year-old office employee who has been working for three years in 8th department of Kikuchi Marketing, a subsidiary of the pharmaceutical company MGN. In the past, he also played volleyball. While weak-willed and shy in his normal form, when he wears the sadistic glasses, his personality instantly changes to confident and commanding. Tatsuya Hirai, who provided Katsuya's voice, noted that Katsuya's personalities vary depending on what relationship he is experiencing.

Mido is a 32-year-old office employee working as the director of the product development department of MGN. Having climbed up to a high position with exceptional speed at a young age, Mido is a perfectionist. He is the project manager of a new product sales campaign that is being developed by the 8th department of Kikuchi Marketing.

Honda is a 25-year-old office employee working in the same department as Katsuya, and the two have been friends since college. He is athletic and was the captain of his volleyball team, with a promising career in sports. He is working hard to ensure that the 8th department will not be laid off.

Katagiri is a 43-year-old office employee and the manager of Katsuya's department. He used to be married with children but has since divorced and currently lives alone with his two cockatiels, Montenmaru and Shizukagozen. He is available as a love interest if Katsuya is wearing his glasses.

Taichi is a 21-year-old college student working part-time at Café Lloyd, a coffee shop near Katsuya's apartment. He is easygoing and listens attentively to Katsuya. He is available as a love interest if Katsuya is not wearing his glasses.

Aki is an attractive boy who slept with Katsuya on the first night he wore the glasses. Unable to forget their first meeting, Katsuya looks for him in the city and at clubs. Aki is then taken in to live with Katsuya as his "pet cat." He is available as a love interest if Katsuya is wearing his glasses.
Mr. R

Mr. R is a mysterious man who Katsuya meets one evening at a park near his office building and is the one who gave him the glasses.

Media

Video game

Kichiku Megane is created by Spray and published by Visual Arts for Microsoft Windows. The game was first released as a limited edition bundle on July 20, 2007, before later seeing a general release on October 12, 2007. The game's theme song is "Under the Darkness", which briefly went viral on Nicovideo for its mondegreen lyrics. The game was followed by the fan disc sequel Kichiku Megane R, with the limited edition released on March 27, 2009, and the standard version released on February 5, 2010. Aside from the story mode, Kichiku Megane R includes a typing game titled , where salacious phrases are typed under a time limit to cause a selected character to go into various states of undress.

Novels

A novel adaptation of the same is written by Tamami, the writer of the original game. , who provided artwork to the game, also provided illustrations for the novel. The books were published by Libre Publishing under the B-Boy Slash Novels imprint.

Manga

Main adaptation

A manga adaptation is written and illustrated by Fuhri Misasagi. It was serialized in the monthly  manga magazine Magazine Be × Boy beginning with the October 2007 issue released on September 7, 2007. It was later compiled in four bound volumes by Libre Publishing under the Super BBC imprint. In 2019, Hifumi Store exclusively published a compilation of all the unofficial  that Misasagi had created and sold at events over the years.

Anthologies

In 2009, Libre Publishing released an official comic anthology under the F'packs imprint.

Other

In 2013, Ohzora Publishing released a 4-panel comic illustrated by Io Kazuki under the Missy Comics imprint.

Discography

Audio drama albums

Two original audio dramas were released on CD in 2007, with one version focusing on Katsuya's personality with his glasses on and the other without his glasses. Following the release of Kichiku Megane R in 2009, a second series of audio drama CDs were released, with all scenarios written by the scenario writer of Kichiku Megane R, Tamami. Team Entertainment pre-released the drama CD Kichiku Megane de "Yuku Nen Kuru Nen": Katsuya & Honda-hen at their booth at Comic Market 79 from December 29 to December 31, 2010.

Soundtrack

References

External links
  

2007 video games
Japan-exclusive video games
LGBT-related video games
Manga based on video games
Video games developed in Japan
Windows-only games
Yaoi anime and manga
Yaoi video games